Public Service Building may refer to:
 Public Service Building (Denver, Colorado), listed on the National Register of Historic Places in Denver
 Public Service Building (Libertyville, Illinois), listed on the National Register of Historic Places in Illinois
 Public Service Building (Portland, Oregon), a private office building
 Portland Building, in Portland, Oregon, a government building referred to in some documents as the Portland Public Service Building
 Public Service Building (Milwaukee, Wisconsin), listed on the National Register of Historic Places in Wisconsin
 City Public Service Company Building, in San Antonio, Texas, listed on the National Register of Historic Places in Texas
 Public Service of Oklahoma Building, in Tulsa, Oklahoma, listed on the National Register of Historic Places in Oklahoma
 Western Public Service Building, in Scottsbluff, Nebraska, listed on the National Register of Historic Places in Nebraska